John Greenleaf Whittier School is a historic school building located in the Allegheny West neighborhood of Philadelphia, Pennsylvania. It was designed by architect Henry deCourcy Richards and built in 1913. It is a three-story, brick-faced reinforced concrete building, five bays wide with terra cotta trim.  It has a Classical Revival-style entrance surround with entablature.  It is named for John Greenleaf Whittier (1807-1892).

It was added to the National Register of Historic Places in 1988. The school was closed in 2013.

References

School buildings on the National Register of Historic Places in Philadelphia
Neoclassical architecture in Pennsylvania
School buildings completed in 1913
Upper North Philadelphia
1913 establishments in Pennsylvania
Defunct schools in Pennsylvania